The Southport and St Anne's lifeboats disaster, commonly known as the Mexico disaster, occurred on the evening of the 9th December 1886. In all, 27 lifeboat men lost their lives trying to save the crew of the German barque called the Mexico.

14 of the 16 crew members aboard the Southport Lifeboat, Eliza Fernley, drowned along with all 13 of the St Anne's Lifeboat, Laura Janet.

The 12 crew of the Mexico were eventually rescued by the Lytham Lifeboat, Charles Biggs.

In the words of Queen Victoria, written in her private journal Saturday 11 December 1886, "A dreadful misfortune has happened on the Lancashire coast, the loss of life boats, & many lives, a terrible & inconceivable thing!"

Disaster

On 9 December 1886, Mexico, a Hamburg-registered barque bound for Guayaquil from Liverpool went aground near Southport, in a full west north westerly gale.
A lifeboat, Eliza Fernley, was launched from Southport in response to distress signals from Mexico. When the craft reached Mexico, she was struck by heavy seas and capsized. Two hours later, she was found approximately three miles from Southport at Birkdale. Fourteen of her sixteen crew had perished.

The two survivors, Henry Robinson and John Jackson, were trapped under the boat after she capsized and only survived by freeing themselves, swimming out and clinging onto the keel of the boat, then walking miles back to their homes and raising the alarm. One of them had tried and failed to rescue other comrades who were still trapped under the boat. Amazingly, four other men from the Southport boat initially survived the disaster but subsequently could not be saved.

Between fifteen and twenty minutes after the Southport boat launched, the neighbouring St Anne's lifeboat—Laura Janet—was also called out. Her crew rowed her out to five hundred yards, and then hoisted sail, proceeding to two miles off Southport. In the words of Patrick Howarth, author of Lifeboat: In Danger's hour:  "What happened there has never been clearly established. Two red lights were seen at Southport, which may have been signals from the life–boat. All that is known is that at quarter past eleven the next morning the life–boat was found ashore, bottom up, with three dead bodies hanging on the thwarts with their heads downwards. Every man in the crew was lost".

Additionally, a third lifeboat, from Lytham, reached Mexico. By that time, Mexico had settled on her beam ends, and the crew had lashed themselves to the rigging. The lifeboat, on her maiden rescue, rowed for a mile and a half through the River Ribble, and then rowed to Mexico, rescuing all twelve members of the barque's crew. In the process, the crew shattered three of her oars, and the small craft was filled numerous times with water.

The bodies of the unfortunate lifeboatmen (who were fishermen by trade) were removed from the beaches and laid out in the coaching house of the nearby Birkdale Palace Hotel. The coach house was later converted to a public house, being named The Fishermen's Rest, and is reputed to be haunted by the spirits of the dead men.

The disaster is the worst in the history of the Royal National Lifeboat Institution (RNLI), with 27 lifeboat crew lost.

A public fund for relief of the sixteen widows and fifty orphans was opened with the RNLI contributing £2,000, the queen and the emperor of Germany also contributing. £30,000 was raised in total. A memorial statue of a lifeboatman looking out to sea was placed on the Promenade at St. Anne's. At Southport, a memorial was erected in the Cemetery and a permanent exhibition can be seen in The Atkinson Museum on Lord Street, Southport.  A further memorial was placed in the churchyard of St Cuthbert's Church, Lytham.

In 1925, the RNLI withdrew its service in Southport and left the town with no lifeboat. However, in the late 1980s, after a series of unfortunate tragedies, local families from Southport started to raise funds and eventually bought a new lifeboat for the town stationed at the old RNLI boathouse. The Southport Offshore Rescue Trust is completely independent of the RNLI and like the RNLI it depends entirely on charitable funding.

See also
Birkdale Palace Hotel – Fishermen's Rest

References

External links
Southport Lifeboat
Enquiry report into disaster
A History of the Southport Lifeboats – Eliza Fernley
Wrecks off the Southport Coast

Disasters in Merseyside
Shipwrecks in the Irish Sea
Maritime incidents in December 1886
1886 in England
Maritime incidents in England
Royal National Lifeboat Institution
Lytham St Annes
Southport
December 1886 events